Henri-Jean Jobez (26 June 1865 - 28 May 1931) was a French politician. He served as a member of the Chamber of Deputies in 1897–1898, representing Jura.

References

1865 births
1931 deaths
People from Haute-Saône
French republicans
Members of the 6th Chamber of Deputies of the French Third Republic